Carballo may refer to:

In people:
 Carballo (name), the family name Carballo
 Diego de Souza Carballo, a Uruguayan footballer
 José Rodríguez Carballo, a Spanish Roman Catholic priest
 Julio Adalberto Rivera Carballo, was president of El Salvador
 Manuel Carballo (epidemiologist), epidemiologist 
 Manuel Carballo (gymnast) (born 1982), Spanish artistic gymnast
 Marcelo Carballo, a Bolivian football defender
 María Elena Carballo, the Minister of Youth and Culture in Costa Rica
 Miguel Ángel Carballo, an Argentine professional golfer 
 Pablo Marcos Carballo, an Argentine Air Force Air Commodore 
 Ramiro Carballo, a Salvadoran professional soccer player 
 Carlos Velasco Carballo, (born 16 March 1971) is a Spanish professional football referee
 Jesus Carballo, (born 26 November 1976) Spanish former gymnast who competed in the 1996 Summer Olympics and again in 2004
 Néstor Carballo, a Uruguayan football defender for Uruguay in the 1954 FIFA World Cup
 Ramiro Carballo,(March 1978) Salvadoran professional football player for the Salvadoran Premier League.
 Marcelo Carballo,(December, 1974) Bolivian football defender playing for first division club Wilstermann
 Héctor Federico Carballo,(March, 1980) Argentine footballer currently playing for CA Mitre in Argentina.
 Ezequiel Carballo,(November, 1989) is an Argentine footballer currently playing as a striker.
 Hugo Carballo,(April, 1944) Chilean footballer who played for clubs of Argentina and Chile.

In places:
 Carballo, a municipality in the Province of A Coruña, Spain
 Carballo (Narcea), a civil parish in Asturias, Spain

In music:
 Carballo, the name of the closing track of the Everything Is Green album by New York band The Essex Green